The Invisible Player is a 2016 Italian drama film directed by Stefano Alpini.

The film is a loose adaptation of the novel of the same name by Giuseppe Pontiggia and is set in the city of Pisa. It premiered at WorldFest-Houston Film Festival on 16 April 2016 and was released in Italy on 17 December 2017.

Cast
Luca Lionello as Prof. Stefano Nari
Sergio Albelli as Prof. Matteo Daverio
Guenda Goria as Anna Nari
Francesco Turbanti as Lorenzo
Ludovica Bizzaglia as Olivia
Lorenzo Alessandri as Prof. Gregorio Salutati
Luciana Cipriani as Luisa Daverio
David Riondino as Prof. Liverani
Paolo Benvenuti as Prof. Martelli

References

External links

2016 films
2010s Italian-language films
2016 drama films
Italian drama films
Films set in Pisa
2010s Italian films